This is a list of the inductees of the North America Railway Hall of Fame.

The North America Railway Hall of Fame (NARHF) was founded in 1996 to maintain, preserve and honor railway history with the induction into the Hall of Fame of people, events, structures, railway art forms, rolling stock, technical innovations, railway workers and trains, and inventions all significant to the railway industry. It is housed at the historic Canada Southern Railway Station in St. Thomas, Ontario, Canada.

To understand the following list:

1. Nominations must fit the criteria of having contributed to the railway industry in a significant way on a:
 North American level,
 National level (specific to Canada) or a
 Local level (specific to St. Thomas, Ontario.)

2. Nominations must also be in the categories of:
 Railway Workers & Builders,
 Facilities and Structures,
 Technical Innovations,
 Rolling Stock,
 Railway Art Forms & Events, as well as
 Communities, Businesses, Governments & Groups

3. Anyone may make a nomination for the railway hall of fame. Nomination may be submitted by mail, email or through the hall of fame online submission form.

4. The selection committee makes their choices from all nominations submitted. The inductees are announced at a presentation ceremony at a date decided upon by the hall of fame.

In past years of induction ceremonies have taken place in 1999, 2001, 2006, 2008, 2010 and 2012.

1999
Return to top of page

2001
Return to top of page

2006
Return to top of page

2008
Return to top of page

2010
Return to top of page

2012
Return to top of page

External links
The North America Railway Hall of Fame

References

History of rail transport in Canada
History of rail transportation in the United States
Canada history-related lists
United States history-related lists